Edward Walter "Moose" Krause (born Edward Walter Kriaučiūnas; ; February 2, 1913 – December 11, 1992) was an American football, basketball, and baseball player, track athlete, coach, and college athletics administrator.  He lettered in four sports at the University of Notre Dame, where he was a three-time consensus All-American in basketball (1932–1934).  Krause served as the head basketball coach at Saint Mary's College in Winona, Minnesota, now Saint Mary's University of Minnesota, from 1934 to 1939, at the College of the Holy Cross from 1939 to 1942, and at Notre Dame from 1943 to 1944 and 1946 to 1951, compiling a career college basketball record of 155–114.  He was Notre Dame's athletic director from 1949 to 1981.  Krause was inducted into the Naismith Memorial Basketball Hall of Fame in 1976 and the College Basketball Hall of Fame in 2006.

Early life and playing career
Born Edward Walter Kriaučiūnas in Chicago to Lithuanian immigrant parents, Krause grew up in the Town of Lake section or, as it was once known as, Back of the Yards. His brother, Feliksas Kriaučiūnas, was the captain of Lithuania national basketball team in 1937. His surname was shortened to Krause by his high school football coach, who could not pronounce Kriaučiūnas.

At the University of Notre Dame, Krause competed in track, baseball, football and basketball, becoming the first Notre Dame player to make the halls of fame of both basketball and football. In basketball, he was a three-time consensus All-American, in 1932, 1933, and 1934. Krause played football for the Fighting Irish under Hunk Anderson. He graduated cum laude from Notre Dame with a journalism degree in 1934 .

Coaching career
Krause's coaching career included a five-year stint as head coach in all sports at Saint Mary's College in Winona, Minnesota, now Saint Mary's University of Minnesota; an assistant football coach at the College of the Holy Cross and the University of Notre Dame for ten years; and head basketball coach at the University of Notre Dame in 1943 and again from 1946 to 1951, when he compiled a record of 98–48 (.671).  As acting head football coach at Notre Dame, filling in for an ailing Frank Leahy, Krause was 3–0.

Military service
Krause served in the United States Marines during World War II including a 14-month stretch as an air combat intelligence officer in the South Pacific.

Administrative career
Krause became the assistant athletic director at Notre Dame in 1948.  In March 1949, he was named athletic director, succeeding Frank Leahy, who stepped down from the role to focus on his post as head football coach.

Later years
Krause died on December 11, 1992, at his home in South Bend, Indiana. He was buried in the Cedar Grove Cemetery in Notre Dame, Indiana.

Head coaching record

Football

References

Further reading

External links
 
 Moose Krause at the Saint Mary's University Sports Hall of Fame
 

1913 births
1992 deaths
All-American college men's basketball players
American football tackles
United States Marine Corps personnel of World War II
American men's basketball coaches
American men's basketball players
American people of Lithuanian descent
Baseball coaches from Illinois
Baseball players from Chicago
Basketball coaches from Illinois
Basketball players from Chicago
Centers (basketball)
Coaches of American football from Illinois
De La Salle Institute alumni
Holy Cross Crusaders football coaches
Holy Cross Crusaders men's basketball coaches
Naismith Memorial Basketball Hall of Fame inductees
National Collegiate Basketball Hall of Fame inductees
Notre Dame Fighting Irish athletic directors
Notre Dame Fighting Irish baseball players
Notre Dame Fighting Irish football coaches
Notre Dame Fighting Irish football players
Notre Dame Fighting Irish men's basketball coaches
Notre Dame Fighting Irish men's basketball players
Notre Dame Fighting Irish men's track and field athletes
Players of American football from Chicago
Saint Mary's Cardinals athletic directors
Saint Mary's Cardinals baseball coaches
Saint Mary's Redmen football coaches
Saint Mary's Cardinals men's basketball coaches
Sportspeople from Chicago
Track and field athletes from Chicago
United States Marine Corps officers
Military personnel from Illinois